Sunset Beat is an American television drama series. It ran only two episodes. The remaining four were broadcast in 1992.

It ran on the ABC Television Network in 1990 and 1992.

The show centered around a group of Los Angeles Police Department officers working undercover as a motorcycle gang. They operate out of an abandoned fire station on Sunset Boulevard.

The theme, "Sunset Beat", was composed by Clink Productions.

Cast of characters 
Officer Chris Chesbro – George Clooney
Officer Tim Kelly – Michael DeLuise
Officer Bradley Coolidge – Markus Flanagan
Officer Tucson Smith – Erik King
Captain Ray Parker – James Tolkan
Holly Chesbro (Chris' ex-wife) – Sydney Walsh
Harriet Parker (Ray's ex-wife) – Arlene Golonka

Notes

Sources

External links 

1990 American television series debuts
1990 American television series endings
1992 American television series debuts
1992 American television series endings
Television shows set in Los Angeles
English-language television shows
American Broadcasting Company original programming
1990s American crime drama television series
Serial drama television series
Television shows filmed in Los Angeles